Benissanet is a municipality in the comarca of Ribera d'Ebre in the province of Tarragona, Catalonia, Spain.

References

External links
 Government data pages 

Municipalities in Ribera d'Ebre
Populated places in Ribera d'Ebre